Royal Visit of the Duke and Duchess of Cornwall and York to New Zealand was a 1901 New Zealand documentary film made by the Limelight Department of the Salvation Army in Australia.

New Zealand Prime Minister Richard Seddon gave permission for Joseph Perry to film the visit of the Duke and Duchess of York in Wellington.
It was one New Zealand's early documentary films, going for 8 minutes. The earliest films being from the first of December 1898, the opening of the Auckland Industrial and Mining Exhibition, and Boxing Day that year, Uhlan winning the Auckland Cup at Ellerslie Racecourse.

References

External links

Film information at National Film and Sound Archive

1900s New Zealand films
1901 in New Zealand
1901 films
1900s short documentary films
Black-and-white documentary films
Films set in New Zealand
Limelight Department films
New Zealand short documentary films
New Zealand silent short films